Usher syndrome, also known as Hallgren syndrome, Usher–Hallgren syndrome, retinitis pigmentosa–dysacusis syndrome or dystrophia retinae dysacusis syndrome, is a rare genetic disorder caused by a mutation in any one of at least 11 genes resulting in a combination of hearing loss and visual impairment. It is a major cause of deafblindness and is at present incurable.

Usher syndrome is classed into three subtypes (I, II and III) according to the genes responsible and the onset of deafness. All three subtypes are caused by mutations in genes involved in the function of the inner ear and retina. These mutations are inherited in an autosomal recessive pattern.

The occurrence of Usher syndrome varies across the world and across the different syndrome types, with rates as high as 1 in 12,500 in Germany to as low as 1 in 28,000 in Norway. Type I is most common in Ashkenazi Jewish and Acadian populations, and type III is rarely found outside Ashkenazi Jewish and Finnish populations. Usher syndrome is named after Scottish ophthalmologist Charles Usher, who examined the pathology and transmission of the syndrome in 1914.

Types

Usher syndrome I

People with Usher I are born profoundly deaf and begin to lose their vision in the first decade of life. They also exhibit balance difficulties and learn to walk slowly as children, due to problems in their vestibular system.

Usher syndrome type I can be caused by mutations in any one of several different genes: CDH23, MYO7A, PCDH15, USH1C and USH1G. These genes function in the development and maintenance of inner ear structures such as hair cells (stereocilia), which transmit sound and motion signals to the brain. Alterations in these genes can cause an inability to maintain balance (vestibular dysfunction) and hearing loss. The genes also play a role in the development and stability of the retina by influencing the structure and function of both the rod photoreceptor cells and supporting cells called the retinal pigmented epithelium. Mutations that affect the normal function of these genes can result in retinitis pigmentosa and resultant vision loss.

Worldwide, the estimated prevalence of Usher syndrome type I is 3 to 6 per 100,000 people in the general population. Type I has been found to be more common in people of Ashkenazi Jewish ancestry (central and eastern European) and in the French-Acadian populations (Louisiana). Among Acadians, research into haplotype data is consistent with one single mutation being responsible for all cases of Usher syndrome type I.

Usher syndrome II

People with Usher II are not born deaf and are generally hard-of-hearing rather than deaf, and their hearing does not degrade over time; moreover, they do not seem to have noticeable problems with balance. They also begin to lose their vision later (in the second decade of life) and may preserve some vision even into middle age.

Usher syndrome type II may be caused by mutations in any of three different genes: USH2A, GPR98 and DFNB31. The protein encoded by the USH2A gene, usherin, is located in the supportive tissue in the inner ear and retina. Usherin is critical for the proper development and maintenance of these structures, which may help explain its role in hearing and vision loss. The location and function of the other two proteins are not yet known.

Usher syndrome type II occurs at least as frequently as type I, but because type II may be underdiagnosed or more difficult to detect, it could be up to three times as common as type I.

Usher syndrome III
People with Usher syndrome III are not born deaf but experience a progressive loss of hearing, and roughly half have balance difficulties.

Mutations in only one gene, CLRN1, have been linked to Usher syndrome type III. CLRN1 encodes clarin-1, a protein important for the development and maintenance of the inner ear and retina. However, the protein's function in these structures, and how its mutation causes hearing and vision loss, is still poorly understood.

The frequency of Usher syndrome type III is significant only in the Finnish population as well as the population of Birmingham, UK, and individuals of Ashkenazi Jewish heritage. It has been noted rarely in a few other ethnic groups.

Symptoms and signs
Usher syndrome is characterized by hearing loss and a gradual visual impairment. The hearing loss is caused by a defective inner ear, whereas the vision loss results from retinitis pigmentosa (RP), a degeneration of the retinal cells. Usually, the rod cells of the retina are affected first, leading to early night blindness (nyctalopia) and the gradual loss of peripheral vision. In other cases, early degeneration of the cone cells in the macula occurs, leading to a loss of central acuity. In some cases, the foveal vision is spared, leading to "doughnut vision"; central and peripheral vision are intact, but an annulus exists around the central region in which vision is impaired.

Cause

Usher syndrome is inherited in an autosomal recessive pattern. Several genes have been associated with Usher syndrome using linkage analysis of patient families (Table 1) and DNA sequencing of the identified loci. A mutation in any one of these genes is likely to result in Usher syndrome.

The clinical subtypes Usher I and II are associated with mutations in any one of six (USH1B-G) and three (USH2A, C-D) genes, respectively, whereas only one gene, USH3A, has been linked to Usher III so far. Two other genes, USH1A and USH2B, were initially associated with Usher syndrome, but USH2B has not been verified and USH1A was incorrectly determined and does not exist. Research in this area is ongoing.

Using interaction analysis techniques, the identified gene products could be shown to interact with one another in one or more larger protein complexes. If one of the components is missing, this protein complex cannot fulfil its function in the living cell, and it probably comes to the degeneration the same. The function of this protein complex has been suggested to participate in the signal transduction or in the cell adhesion of sensory cells.

A study shows that three proteins related to Usher syndrome genes (PCDH15, CDH23, GPR98) are also involved in auditory cortex development, in mouse and macaque. Their lack of expression induces a decrease in the number of parvalbumin interneurons. Patients with mutations for these genes could have consequently auditory cortex defects.

Pathophysiology 
The progressive blindness of Usher syndrome results from retinitis pigmentosa. The photoreceptor cells usually start to degenerate from the outer periphery to the center of the retina, including the macula. The degeneration is usually first noticed as night blindness (nyctalopia); peripheral vision is gradually lost, restricting the visual field (tunnel vision), which generally progresses to complete blindness. The qualifier pigmentosa reflects the fact that clumps of pigment may be visible by an ophthalmoscope in advanced stages of degeneration.

The hearing impairment associated with Usher syndrome is caused by damaged hair cells in the cochlea of the inner ear inhibiting electrical impulses from reaching the brain. It is a form of dysacusis.

Diagnosis
Since Usher syndrome is incurable at present, it is helpful to diagnose children well before they develop the characteristic night blindness. Some preliminary studies have suggested as many as 10% of congenitally deaf children may have Usher syndrome. However, a misdiagnosis can have bad consequences.

The simplest approach to diagnosing Usher syndrome is to test for the characteristic chromosomal mutations. An alternative approach is electroretinography, although this is often disfavored for children, since its discomfort can also make the results unreliable. Parental consanguinity is a significant factor in diagnosis. Usher syndrome I may be indicated if the child is profoundly deaf from birth and especially slow in walking.

Thirteen other syndromes may exhibit signs similar to Usher syndrome, including Alport syndrome, Alström syndrome, Bardet–Biedl syndrome, Cockayne syndrome, spondyloepiphyseal dysplasia congenita, Flynn–Aird syndrome, Friedreich ataxia, Hurler syndrome (MPS-1), Kearns–Sayre syndrome (CPEO), Norrie syndrome, osteopetrosis (Albers–Schonberg disease), Refsum disease (phytanic acid storage disease) and Zellweger syndrome (cerebrohepatorenal syndrome).

Classification
Although Usher syndrome has been classified clinically in several ways, the prevailing approach is to classify it into three clinical sub-types called Usher I, II and III in order of decreasing severity of deafness. Although it was previously believed that there was an Usher syndrome type IV, researchers at the University of Iowa recently confirmed that there is no USH type IV. As described below, these clinical subtypes may be further subdivided by the particular gene mutated; people with Usher I and II may have any one of six and three genes mutated, respectively, whereas only one gene has been associated with Usher III. The function of these genes is still poorly understood.

Usher syndrome is a variable condition; the degree of severity is not tightly linked to whether it is Usher I, II or III. For example, someone with type III may be unaffected in childhood but go on to develop a profound hearing loss and a very significant loss of sight by early-to-mid adulthood. Similarly, someone with type I, who is therefore profoundly deaf from birth, may keep good central vision until the sixth decade of life or even beyond. People with type II, who have useful hearing with a hearing aid, can experience a wide range of severity of the RP. Some may maintain good reading vision into their 60s, while others cannot see to read while still in their 40s.

Since Usher syndrome is inherited in an autosomal recessive pattern, both males and females are equally likely to inherit it. Consanguinity of the parents is a risk factor.

Treatment

Since Usher syndrome results from the loss of a gene, gene therapy that adds the proper protein back ("gene replacement") may alleviate it, provided the added protein becomes functional. Recent studies of mouse models have shown one form of the disease—that associated with a mutation in myosin VIIa—can be alleviated by replacing the mutant gene using a lentivirus. However, some of the mutated genes associated with Usher syndrome encode very large proteins—most notably, the USH2A and GPR98 proteins, which have roughly 6000 amino-acid residues. Gene replacement therapy for such large proteins may be difficult.

Epidemiology 
Usher syndrome is responsible for the majority of deafblindness. It occurs in roughly 1 in 23,000 people in the United States, 1 in 28,000 in Norway, and 1 in 12,500 in Germany. People with Usher syndrome represent roughly one-sixth of people with retinitis pigmentosa.

History 

Usher syndrome is named after the Scottish ophthalmologist Charles Usher, who examined the pathology and transmission of this illness in 1914 on the basis of 69 cases. However, it was first described in 1858 by Albrecht von Gräfe, a pioneer of modern ophthalmology. He reported the case of a deaf patient with retinitis pigmentosa, who had two brothers with the same symptoms. Three years later, one of his students, Richard Liebreich, examined the population of Berlin for disease pattern of deafness with retinitis pigmentosa. Liebreich noted Usher syndrome to be recessive, since the cases of blind-deafness combinations occurred particularly in the siblings of blood-related marriages or in families with patients in different generations. His observations supplied the first proofs for the coupled transmission of blindness and deafness, since no isolated cases of either could be found in the family trees.

Animal models of this human disease (such as knockout mice and zebrafish) have been developed recently to study the effects of these gene mutations and to test potential cures for Usher syndrome.

Notable cases
 Rebecca Alexander, a psychotherapist, author, and recipient of the Helen Keller Achievement Award.
 Christine "Coco" Roschaert, director of the Nepal Deafblind Project, kick-off speaker for Deaf Awareness Week at the University of Vermont, and participant in the Gallaudet United Now Movement.
 Catherine Fischer wrote her autobiography of growing up with Usher syndrome in Louisiana, entitled Orchid of the Bayou.
 Vendon Wright has written two books describing his life with Usher syndrome, I was blind but now I can see and Through my eyes.
 Christian Markovic, and blind-deaf illustrator and designer; Fuzzy Wuzzy Designs.
 John Tracy, the son of actor Spencer Tracy and namesake of the oralist John Tracy Clinic.
 James D. Watson, DNA helix co-discoverer and Nobel laureate, has homozygous USH1B mutations, according to his published genome. It is not clear why he did not develop the syndrome. This lack of genetic penetrance argues that expression of the phenotype of Usher syndrome may be more complex than originally assumed.
 The Israeli Nalaga'at (do touch) Deaf-blind Acting Ensemble consists of 11 deaf-blind actors, most of whom are diagnosed with Usher syndrome. The theater group has put on several productions and appeared both locally in Israel and abroad in London and Broadway.
 Katie Kelly, a gold medal-winning paralympian.
 Teigan Van Roosmalen, paraolympian.
 Cyril Axelrod, Catholic priest.
 Robert Tarango, first deafblind person to star in a movie, in the role of Artie in the Oscar-nominated short film Feeling Through.

References

Further reading

External links 

 GeneReviews/NCBI/NIH/UW entry on Usher Syndrome Type I
 GeneReviews/NCBI/NIH/UW entry on Usher Syndrome Type II
 NCBI Genetic Testing Registry
 General overview from the NIH
 Usher Syndrome Information from the National Institute on Deafness and Other Communication Disorders (NIDCD).

Autosomal recessive disorders
Ashkenazi Jews topics
Cytoskeletal defects
Diseases of the ear and mastoid process
Rare diseases
Syndromes affecting hearing
Syndromes affecting the eye
Rare syndromes